Braindead Soundmachine were an American industrial rock band founded by Cole Coonce,  Warren Croyle (aka "Mr. Reality"), and Ikky Shivers. Eschewing the industrial genre, they coined the name metaldisco in reference to their musical style.

History
Braindead Soundmachine was founded in Los Angeles, California, United States, in 1989 as a joint effort between Coonce and speed metal record producer Croyle, as they conceptualized "metaldisco," a genre that melded Black Sabbath riffs topped by disco rhythm guitar and ethereal female vocals. The band was rounded out by Shivers, a Los Angeles sound engineer, whose aural contribution consisted of non-musical screeching noises coerced out of his collections of refurbished vintage analog synthesizers.

Following Coonce's edict that "singers are like spark plugs, you screw them in and then you screw them out," Braindead utilized the services of sundry female vocalists, including those of Joan Jones from Sun 60, Khalsoum Salloum and JenJen (Jenny Homer from Downy Mildew).

As "a band obsessed with drag racing, drag queens and the apocalyptic downfall of the entertainment industry," Braindead reveled in the absurdity of life in Los Angeles, as well as in its own anarchy.

The band followed a simple ethos that "there are no mistakes", with only one rule: "no chord changes".

The band's zen anarchic approach to making music was also informed by its insistence that Yoshi, a transplanted Japanese transvestite working as a cocktail waitress in East Hollywood, was in fact "Dogvillasan", a deity (or "Coyote God") summoned by the group in the song of the same name.

In 1990, and with the band's theology, philosophy and musical approach finalized, Braindead procured a recording contract with Chicago's Wax Trax! Records, which put out the band's first long-playing compact disc, Come Down from the Hills and Make My Baby.

Singles from that album included "I'm in Jail", and a throbbing, discordant cover of Patsy Cline's "Walkin' After Midnight" (whose release included remixes of the song produced by KMFDM founder Sascha Konietzko).

In 1992, Coonce scored the Greg Araki indie film The Living End, a queer road movie that also featured Braindead's version of the Jesus and Mary Chain song that gave the film its title.

As Wax Trax! began to succumb to an eventual collapse and bankruptcy, Braindead sought to extricate itself from their contract.

With their release eventually granted, Braindead's second album, Give Me Something Hard I Can Take To My Grave, was distributed on Shiver Records in the US, and Artlos in Europe.

The group disbanded in 1994 during pre-production for its never-released third album, after Mr. Reality suggested taking the band's ethos of only using one chord per composition into further musical deconstruction by mandating new songs use only "one note," an idea that Coonce found unworkable.

After its creative collapse, the three founding members quit music and procured employment as sound engineers in game shows and the adult film industry, an existential downturn documented in Coonce's memoirs about the music business, released in 2005 and also entitled Come Down from the Hills and Make My Baby.

In 1995, the band re-grouped for its final musical endeavor, recording the source music in Dan Zukovic's cult film The Last Big Thing. With its scathing satirical attack on the entertainment culture of Los Angeles, the film's ethos is quite similar to Braindead's.

Eventually Coonce changed occupations and became a freelance drag strip journalist of some renown, writing for publications as varied as National Dragster, Hot Rod Magazine and WIRED. This pursuit peaked with feature-length book on the history of the land speed record, Infinity Over Zero.

In 2007, JenJen collaborated with Coonce in a new musical venture entitled Prozac Pop Machine. Their first single is "Shampoo" and is currently available podcast-only.

Croyle is now CEO of the multi-media conglomerate Reality Entertainment. Originally an outlet for ponderous and aggressive speed metal bands, in 2006 Reality signed seminal disco music superstars KC and the Sunshine Band to a recording contract, a move which Croyle heralded by stating that: "KC has affected generations of music lovers around the world, we are thrilled to have KC on the Reality roster." It could be argued that with its signing of KC and The Sunshine Band, and by finally synergistically melding heavy metal with disco, Reality Entertainment succeeded where Braindead failed. Ikky Shivers died in June, 2001.

Musical style
In interviews, Braindead has never been shy about citing their influences. They ripped off N.W.A's hip hop drum machine sound, Black Sabbath's bass lines and the guitar stylings of Chic, Fela Kuti and Funkadelic. The floaty, dreamy and drolly defiant female vocals are reminiscent of Julee Cruise and Lesley Gore.

Discography

Albums
 Come Down from the Hills and Make My Baby (Wax Trax!, 1991)
 Give Me Something Hard I Can Take to My Grave (Shivers Records, 1993)

Singles and EPs
 "I'm in Jail" b/w "Dogvillasan" (Nitro Records, 1990)
 "I'm in Jail" (Wax Trax!, 1991)
 "Walkin' After Midnight" b/w "Everybody, Everybody" (Wax Trax!, 1992)
 "Where the Pavement Ends" b/w  "Soon Come, Goddammit" (Artlos, 1993)

References

External links

Braindead Soundmachine Official Braindead Soundmachine website
MySpace Braindead Soundmachine Myspace
Walkin' After Midnight Braindead Sound Machine- Walkin' After Midnight video
Prick Magazine COME DOWN FROM THE HILLS & MAKE MY BABY book review
Los Angeles Alternative Press COME DOWN FROM THE HILLS book review

Musical groups established in 1989
American industrial rock musical groups
Rock music groups from California
Musical groups disestablished in 1993
Wax Trax! Records artists